George Saunders (born 28 May 1949) is a Canadian former wrestler, born in Toronto, who competed in the 1972 Summer Olympics.

References

External links
 

1949 births
Living people
Sportspeople from Toronto
Olympic wrestlers of Canada
Wrestlers at the 1972 Summer Olympics
Canadian male sport wrestlers
20th-century Canadian people